The Bronx Tigers were a minor professional ice hockey team that played in the Canadian American Hockey League (CAHL) in 1931–32.

They were also an amateur team that played in the Eastern Hockey League (EHL) in 1933–34 and 1937–38.  The amateur team played in the Bronx Coliseum on East 177th Street in the borough of Bronx in New York City, New York.

Standings

CAHL
In 1931–32 they finished with an 18-15-7 W-L-T record, good for fourth place. They lost the semi-final.

EHL
They finished out of the playoffs in both of their EHL seasons.

Notable players
The following members of the Bronx Tigers (CAHL) also played in the NHL:

Andy Aitkenhead
Oscar Asmundson
Frank Beisler
Billy Boucher
Leo Bourgeault
Gene Chouinard
Jake Forbes
Frank Foyston
Len Grosvenor
Roger Jenkins
Buddy Maracle
George Massecar
Gord Pettinger
Hal Picketts
Ellie Pringle
Bill Regan
Johnny Sheppard

References

Eastern Hockey League teams
Defunct ice hockey teams in the United States
Canadian-American Hockey League teams
Ice hockey teams in New York (state)
Defunct sports teams in New York City
Sports in the Bronx
West Farms, Bronx